Sunshine is the second studio album by American rock duo Talk Normal. It was released in October 2012 under Joyful Noise Recordings.

Track listing

References

2012 albums
Joyful Noise Recordings albums